Integris Health Edmond is a not-for-profit hospital located in Edmond, Oklahoma, and accredited through the Joint Commission. Opened on October 3, 2011, the hospital offers medical, surgical, and rehabilitation services to Oklahoma, Logan, and Lincoln counties.

Medical services
Health Edmond's campus consists of a full service hospital with 40 inpatient beds and a medical office building. Facilities include a Level III emergency department and an intensive care unit.

Outpatient rehabilitation
Jim Thorpe Rehabilitation offers a variety of services including physical therapy, occupational therapy, and speech and language pathology.

Awards and recognition
2012
Certified Health Oklahoma, Excellent Business Award
2013
Quality Respiratory Care Recognition presented by American Association for Respiratory Care.  This award identifies facilities that use qualified respiratory therapist while maintaining the guidelines set forth by the governing agency.
Voluntary Hospitals of America (VHA) Regional High Performance Award for Emergency Department in Length of Stay and Left Without Being Seen Rate
VHA Regional Patient Safety Award for Clinical Excellence in Prevention of Complications, catheter associated blood stream infections
Press Ganey Guardian of Excellence Award for Physician Partnership. Press Ganey is an organization whose mission is to allow patients to have a voice in how they are treated within a healthcare system.
Press Ganey Guardian of Excellence Award for Patient Satisfaction, Ambulatory Surgery

References

External links
 Official site

Edmond, Oklahoma
Hospitals in Oklahoma